Stijn Wuytens (born 8 October 1989) is a Belgian professional footballer who plays as a centre back for Lommel in the Belgian First Division B.

Club career
Wuytens began his career at Genk, before being transferred to the PSV Eindhoven-youth division in 2001. Wuytens made his senior debut for PSV in the 2008 Johan Cruyff Shield match against Feyenoord Rotterdam. On 2 February 2009, he was loaned out to De Graafschap until the end of the season, before returning to PSV. On 12 June 2012, it was announced that he would switch to the Belgian team Beerschot for the next season.

AZ
In the winter break of the 2015–16 season, Wuytens transferred to AZ Alkmaar. Here he was set up as a central defender by trainer John van den Brom, with Ron Vlaar at his side. The following season, Wuytens made his first goal for AZ, in an away match against FK Vojvodina in the Europa League. Wuytens also made his second goal in the Europa League for AZ on 15 September 2016. This time, he scored in a home game against the Irish Dundalk FC. While scoring, he came into direct contact with Dundalk goalkeeper Gary Rogers. It turned out that Wuytens was unconscious for a moment, swallowed his tongue and suffered a concussion.

Lommel
In June 2020 Wuytens moved to Belgian side Lommel, an ambitious club that City Football Group bought in May 2020. He signed a contract with Lommel, keeping him there until June 2025.

Personal life
Stijn Wuytens is the brother of Dries Wuytens who plays professionally for Waasland-Beveren in Belgium, and cousin of  ex-AZ player Jan Wuytens

Career statistics

Honours

Club
PSV
Johan Cruijff Shield: 2008

Willem II
Eerste Divisie: 2013–14

References

External links
 
 https://www.vi.nl/spelers/stijn-wuytens/carriere
 
 Wuytens Profile 
 PSV Jeugd Profile 

Living people
1989 births
Footballers from Brussels
Association football defenders
Eredivisie players
Eerste Divisie players
PSV Eindhoven players
De Graafschap players
Beerschot A.C. players
Willem II (football club) players
AZ Alkmaar players
Lommel S.K. players
Belgian footballers
Belgium under-21 international footballers
Belgium youth international footballers
Belgian expatriate sportspeople in the Netherlands
Belgian expatriate footballers
Expatriate footballers in the Netherlands
Belgian Pro League players
Challenger Pro League players